Adelaida Ruiz (born October 17, 1988) is an American professional boxer who has held the WBC Silver female super flyweight title since September 2021.

Adelaida Ruiz was born in Los Angeles, California , USA  raised in the city of Lynwood, California, USA .

Professional career
Ruiz made her professional debut on April 21, 2017, scoring a four-round unanimous decision (UD) victory against Rebecca Light at the Quiet Cannon in Montebello, California.

After compiling a record of 9–0 (4 KOs), she faced reigning champion Sonia Osorio for the WBC female interim super flyweight title on March 20, 2021 at the Krystal Grand Hotel in Nuevo Vallarta, Mexico. Following an accidental clash of heads in the first round, the referee called a halt to the contest on advice from the ringside doctor at the end of round two, resulting in a second-round technical draw (TD).

In her next fight she faced Nancy Franco de Alba for the vacant WBC Silver female super flyweight title on September 25 at the Sports Arena in Pico Rivera, California. After unleashing a barrage of punches, referee Raul Caiz Jr. stepped in to call a halt to the contest at 1 minute and 20 seconds of the ninth round.

Professional boxing record

References

External links

Living people
1988 births
Boxers from Los Angeles
American women boxers
Super-flyweight boxers
21st-century American women